Martin Karoli Ngoga is an Rwandan Lawyer and politician, currently working as the speaker for East African Legislative Assembly. He is also a former Prosecutor General of Rwanda and Special Representative to International Criminal Tribunal for Rwanda.

He is the deputy chairperson of the FIFA Ethics Committee in charge of investigatory chamber.

In 2019, during his meeting with speaker of the Parliament of Tanzania, Job Yustino Ndugai they decided to speedily embrace the Monetary Union, whose common currency would stipulate stability and with a stable exchange rate in the East African region, after EALA had  passed two key pieces of legislation  the East African Monetary Institute Bill, 2018 and the EAC Statistics Bill, 2017.

He joined EALA after beating Jennifer Wibabara, whom they were both fronted by the ruling Rwanda Patriotic Front (RPF-Inkotanyi) for legislators to choose who to send to Eala to replace MP Abdul Karim Harelimana, who had resigned.

In 2019, the East African Court of Justice , under Lady Justice Monica Mugenyi dismissed an application filed by Burundi that was challenging his election  as a speaker in December 2017, saying that Rwanda boycotted the elections according to EALA rules of Procedures and the tennets of East African Community Treaty.

He recently urged the community member states to put  possible measures to have a common approach on COVID-19 pandemic such that citizens can continue to enjoy the benefits of integration.

In 2019, Ngoga was allegedly reported that he had paid some media houses in the region like NTV and NBS Television to defame the Secretary General of EAC and the Burundian Ambassador in Tanzania, Libérat Mfumukeko that he had swindled the EAC funds.

On 8 August 2007,as the Attorney General of the Republic of Rwanda, addressed indictment and arrest warrant on one  of genocide leaders Fabien Neretse  to France  through Interpol, requesting his extradition.

References

 
East African Community officials
African Union officials
Arusha
Nairobi
Supernational legislators
Living people
Year of birth missing (living people)